Michael Norman Elliott (born 3 June 1932) was a Member of the European Parliament (MEP) for London West.

Elliott was educated at the Brunel College of Technology before becoming a research chemist.  He also became active in the Labour Party, serving on Ealing Borough Council from 1964 until 1986.  At the 1984 European Parliament election, he was elected to represent London West, serving until 1999.

References

1932 births
Labour Party (UK) MEPs
MEPs for England 1984–1989
MEPs for England 1989–1994
MEPs for England 1994–1999
Living people